Birgit Ragnhild Cullberg (3 August 1908 – 8 September 1999) was a Swedish choreographer. Her father Carl Cullberg was a bank director and her mother was Elna Westerström. Cullberg was born in Nyköping and was married from 1942 to 1949 to actor Anders Ek. She was the mother of Niklas Ek in 1943, and twins Mats Ek, and Malin Ek in 1945.

Cullberg studied ballet under Kurt Jooss-Leeder and Lilian Karina and at The Royal Ballet, London (1952–1957). In 1960, Cullberg was appointed director and choreographer at the Stockholm City Theatre. Some of her choreographies were premiered at the Royal Opera in Stockholm.

Cullberg gained international recognition by founding the Cullberg Ballet in the 1960s. On her retirement in 1985, her son Mats Ek took over the ballet company. The Swedish Arts Grants Committee instituted the Cullberg scholarship in her honour, and she was awarded an honorary professorship at Stockholm University, where she had studied when she was young. In 1977 she was awarded the Litteris et Artibus and in 1983 the Illis quorum. She also received the French honour Commandeur des Arts et Lettres and the Italian honour Cavaliere Ufficiale al Merito della Repubblica Italiana.

Selected choreography

 Vägen till Klockrike
 Miss Julie
 The Moon Reindeer
 The Lady from the Sea

References

Further reading

External links
NY Times obituary by Anna Kisselgoff, 13 September 1999
The Independent obituary by Nadine Meisner, 27 September 1999

 Cullberg Ballet history

1908 births
1999 deaths
Ballet choreographers
Swedish choreographers
Swedish expatriates in Iran
Litteris et Artibus recipients
People from Nyköping Municipality
Ek family
Recipients of the Illis quorum